This is a list of '''electoral results for the Electoral District of Gordon in South Australian elections.

Members for Gordon

Election results

Elections in the 1990s

References

South Australian state electoral results by district